Bordu is an urban-type settlement in the Kemin District of Chüy Region of Kyrgyzstan. Its population was 124 in 2021.

Population

References

Populated places in Chüy Region